Bintan Agro Beach Resort is a hotel and resort in Bintan, Indonesia. Located on the southeastern coast, the resort was established following extensive investment from Singapore.

References

External links
Official site

Hotels in Bintan Island
Resorts in Indonesia